Negros Oriental, officially the Province of Negros Oriental, is a province in the Philippines located in the Central Visayas region. Its capital is the city of Dumaguete. It occupies the southeastern half of the large island of Negros, and borders Negros Occidental, which comprises the northwestern half. It also includes Apo Island, a popular dive site for both local and foreign tourists.

Negros Oriental faces Cebu to the east across the Tañon Strait and Siquijor to the south-east (which happened to be part of the province before). The primary spoken language is Cebuano and the predominant religious denomination is Roman Catholicism. Dumaguete is the capital, seat of government and most populous city of the province. With a population of 1,432,990 inhabitants, it is the second most-populous province in Central Visayas after Cebu, the fifth most-populous province in the Visayas and the 19th most-populous province of the Philippines.

History

Negros, the largest island in the Visayas, is believed to have once been part of a larger landmass that was cut off by rising waters at the end of the last ice age. Among the early inhabitants of the island were the Negritos and the Austronesians, and later the Han Chinese, who are mainly merchants. They called the island "Buglas", a native word which is believed to mean "cut off".

Spanish explorers on the expedition of Miguel Lopez de Legazpi first came to the island in April 1565. Legazpi dropped anchor in Bohol and sent his men to scout the island. Because of the strong currents of the Tañon Strait between Cebu and Negros, they were carried for several days and forced to land on the western side of the island. They reported seeing many dark-skinned inhabitants, and they called the island "Negros" (Negro means "black" in Spanish). The island was sparsely settled at the time, except for a few coastal settlements including Ilog and Binalbagan. In 1571, Legaspi assigned encomiendas on the island to 13 of his men. Augustinian friars began the Christianization of the island the next year. The island was administered as part of the jurisdiction of Oton until 1734 when it became a military district, and Ilog became the capital of the island. The capital was transferred to Himamaylan in 1795. Negros became a politico-military province in 1865 and the capital was transferred to Bacolod.

Due to its proximity to Mindanao, the southeastern coasts of Negros was in constant threat from Moro marauders looking for slaves, so watchtowers were built to protect the Christian villages. The Moro raids and Negros Oriental's distance from the Negrense capital of Bacolod, induced 13 Recollectionist priests to petition for the division of the island in July 1876. The island of Negros was then divided into the provinces of Negros Oriental and Negros Occidental by a royal decree executed by Governor General Valeriano Weyler on January 1, 1890. Dumaguete was made the first and only capital of Negros Oriental. In 1892, Siquijor became a part of Negros Oriental, having previously been administered by Spain under the politico-military province of Bohol.

The Philippine Revolution reached Negros in 1898, disrupting government functions but without extreme violence and bloodshed. Revolutionary troops in the island were composed mostly of farm labourers and other prominent people of the province of Negros Oriental, who were organized and led by Don Diego de la Viña. The Spanish colonial government in Dumaguete and the rest of the island was overthrown on November 24, 1898. Later, the Negros Occidental area under the leadership of Gen. Araneta, along with the Negros Oriental area under the leadership of Don Diego de la Viña, merged to form the Cantonal Republic of Negros, a separate government from the more familiar Malolos Republic established in Luzon.

In 1901, the Negros Oriental province was reorganized by the United States and a civil government was established with Demetrio Larena as governor. The American government made Siquijor a "sub-province" of Negros Oriental. Negros Oriental became a province under the American civil government on March 10, 1917, through Act 2711. In 1934, Negros Oriental became a corregimiento, a separate military district. Under the American colonial government, transportation infrastructure was developed with improvements of roads and new bridges.

During World War II, both Negros provinces were invaded by Imperial Japanese forces, resorting many residents to flee to the inland mountains. Negros Island was liberated by combined Philippine & American troops with the local Negrense guerillas attacking the Japanese on August 6, 1945. The 7th, 73rd, 74th and 75th Infantry Divisions of the Philippine Commonwealth Army were established from January 3, 1942, to June 30, 1946, and the 7th Constabulary Regiment of the Philippine Constabulary was active from October 28, 1944, to June 30, 1946, at the Military General Headquarters in Negros Oriental. They started the engagements of the Anti-Japanese Imperial Military Operations in Negros from 1942 to 1945 against the Japanese Imperial forces.

Modern-day history

On September 17, 1971, Siquijor finally became an independent province by virtue of Republic Act No. 6396.
 	
On May 29, 2015, the Negros Island Region was formed when Negros Oriental was separated from Central Visayas and transferred to the new region along with Negros Occidental and Bacolod, when President Benigno Aquino III signed Executive Order No. 183, s. 2015. But it was abolished on August 9, 2017, when President Rodrigo Duterte revoked Executive Order No. 183, s. 2015 through the signage of Executive Order No. 38, citing the reason of the lack of funds to fully establish the NIR according to Benjamin Diokno, the Secretary of Budget and Management, reverting Negros Oriental back into Central Visayas. However, with the Philippines' current presidential administration promoting federalism, the idea of the twin provinces of Negros Oriental and Negros Occidental reunified into one federal state/region is already in the talks of local provincial politicians, with some additional support from the known native Negrenses. There is also a suggestion, jointly approved by the provincial governors, that Negros Oriental along with Negros Occidental, be renamed with their pre-colonial names as "Buglas Sidlakan" and "Buglas Nakatundan" respectively, with Negros, as a federal state, be named as "Negrosanon Federated Region", due to the negative racial connotation associated with the name "Negros".

Geography

Negros Oriental occupies the south-eastern half of the island of Negros, with Negros Occidental comprising the north-western half. A chain of rugged mountains separates Negros Oriental from Negros Occidental. Negros Oriental faces Cebu to the east across the Tañon Strait and Siquijor to the southeast. The Sulu Sea borders it to the south to southwest. Negros is basically volcanic, making its soil ideal for agriculture. Eighty percent of all arable land in the island region is cultivated.

Topography

The province's topography is characterized by low, grooved mountain ranges of which some lie close to the shoreline. There are a few flatlands and plateaus in the interior to the southwest of the province, which includes the Tablas Plateau.

One of the landmarks of Dumaguete is the Dumaguete Bell Tower which stands next to the Saint Catherine of Alexandria Cathedral. It once used to warn the city of impending pirate attacks.

Climate
Negros Oriental has a tropical climate. Because of the mountain range running from the north to the south, the province has two types of climatic conditions. The eastern part of the province is characterized by unpronounced maximum rainfall with a short dry season lasting from one to three months. The western half of the province is characterized by a distinct wet season and dry season.

Administrative divisions

Negros Oriental comprises 19 municipalities and 6 cities, further subdivided into 557 barangays.

Dumaguete is the provincial capital and seat of government. It is also the province's most populous city, despite having the smallest land area among all component cities and municipalities of Negros Oriental.

For purposes of legislative representation, the cities and municipalities are grouped into three congressional districts, with each district electing a congressman to the House of Representatives of the Philippines.

Demographics

As of 2010, its registered voting population are 606,634. 34.5% of the population are concentrated in the six most populous component cities of Dumaguete, Bayawan, Guihulngan, Tanjay, Bais and Canlaon. Population growth per year is about 0.99% over the period of 2010–2015, lower than the national average of 1.72%.

Residents of Negros are called "Negrenses" (and less often "Negrosanons") and many are of either pure/mixed Austronesian heritage, with foreign ancestry (i.e. Chinese and/or Spanish) as minorities. Negros Oriental is predominantly a Cebuano-speaking province due to its close proximity to Cebu, with 72% of residents reporting it as a first language. Hiligaynon is spoken by the remaining 28% and is common in areas close to the border with Negros Occidental. Filipino and English, while seldom used as first languages, are generally understood and used for official, literary, and educational purposes.

Religion
Christianity is the predominant religion in the province with Roman Catholicism (77%) as the largest single denomination . However, there is a strong and growing presence of mainline and evangelical Protestant which forms about 12% of the province population. The Iglesia ni Cristo(1.4%), the Seventh-day Adventists, Jehovah's Witnesses and the Aglipayan Church, also known as the Philippine Independent Church,  also have some presence. Adherents of Islam and Buddhism constitute a minority of the population.

Economy

With its vast fertile land resources, Negros Oriental's other major industry is agriculture. The primary crops are sugarcane, sweetcorn, coconut and rice. In the coastal areas, fishing is the main source of income. People are also involved in cattle ranches, fish ponds and rubber plantations, especially in Bayawan. There are also mineral deposits like gold, silver and copper found throughout the inner areas of the province.

The province is already emerging as a major technological center in Visayas, with its growing business process outsourcing (BPO) that has started to penetrate the province's secondary cities and other technology-related industries. Vehicle assembly is a growing industry in Amlan. Construction of mass housing and subdivisions is very evident in the periphery of Dumaguete and is expected to spillover into the province's secondary cities and fast-growing towns.

Other industries include water bottling and warehousing, as well as cold and dry storing. Retailing has penetrated other urban areas outside Dumaguete, with the entry of supermarkets and shopping malls in cities such as Bayawan, Tanjay and Bais. The town of Bacong, which borders Dumaguete in the south, hosts many industrial plants geared for the local and export markets, which can bolster economic growth. Negros Oriental is also a notable tourist destination in the Visayas.

Transportation

Negros Oriental has a network of roads, including a national road that spans the circumference of Negros Island. National and provincial roads in the province total more than 900 kilometers, though only about half of these are paved.

A large portion of residents do not own private vehicles, and are totally reliant on public transport. Buses and jeepneys link the cities and municipalities of the province. For short distances within a town, motorized tricycles (locally known as "pedicabs") are available. Moreover, motorcycles for hire locally called as habal-habal is the primary mode of transportation in the hinterlands or places wherein it can't be reached with other types of vehicles.

Dumaguete Airport, located in Sibulan, is the province's only commercial airport. It is a domestic airport with multiple daily flights to and from Manila, served by Philippine Airlines and Cebu Pacific. The airport also serves flights to and from Cebu and Cagayan de Oro. Based on 2002 statistics, an average of 5,800 outgoing passengers and 5,700 incoming passengers pass through the airport every month. However, this airport is due for transfer to Bacong because of congestion in its current location and has been on proposal since 2014 and still pending final approval as of 2022. Yet in March 2021, upgrade works were made to the current Sibulan Airport which include pavement reconstruction, expansion of the terminal building from 1,152sqm. to 1,842sqm., and expansion of CAAP administrative buildings.

The primary seaport of the province is located in Dumaguete. Additionally, there are five other seaports in the province classified as tertiary.

Education

Most colleges and universities in the province are concentrated in Dumaguete, which befit the role as Center of Learning in the South and is widely known as a university city. Here are the list of some universities, colleges and other tertiary institutions located in the province of Negros Oriental:

Culture

Each town in Negros Oriental celebrates an annual town fiesta, usually dedicated to a patron saint of a particular town or city. In some of the larger towns, there are particular fiestas for specific neighborhoods or barangays.

 Jimalalud: January 15 - Sr. Sto. Niño
 Canlaon: March 19 - Sr. San Jose
 Sibulan: June 13 - St. Anthony of Padua
 Tayasan: June 13 - St. Anthony of Padua
 Tanjay City: July 25 - St. James the Greater
 Bacong: August 28 - St. Augustine of Hippo
 Bais: September 10 - St. Nicholas of Tolentino
 Dauin: September 10 - St. Nicholas of Tolentino
 Manjuyod: October 4 - St. Francis of Assisi
 Dumaguete: November 25 - St. Catherine of Alexandria
 Amlan: November 30 - St. Andrew

Additionally, the Buglasan Festival, which was revived in 2001, is celebrated annually in October in the provincial capital of Dumaguete and is hailed as Negros Oriental's "festival of festivals". It is a week-long celebration where you can see unique booths of each town and city in Negros Oriental featuring their native products and tourist attractions. The highlight of the occasion is the float parade and street dancing competition.

The province is the home of the last living remnants of the Inata language speakers. The Sebwano language is spoken throughout the province, while the indigenous Minagahat language is spoken in the south.

Media
There are at least seven local 
media publications in general circulation around the province. These publications include Dumaguete MetroPost, The Negros Chronicle, Dumaguete Star Informer, Times Focus, and Island News. Sun.Star Dumaguete publishes news online bi-weekly. PLDT, Globe Telecom and their subsidiaries are major providers of network connection within the province. Major providers, in TV and radio are ABS-CBN, GMA, TV5 and CNN Philippines. Cable TV provides access to BBC, ESPN and other international programs. The province is mainly served by one regional newscast: TV Patrol Central Visayas (shared with ABS-CBN Cebu).

See also
Negros Oriental State University
Silliman University
Dumaguete
Balinsasayao Twin Lakes Natural Park

References

External links

 
 
 
 Official Website of the Provincial Government of Negros Oriental
 Local Governance Performance Management System
 Official Website of the Buglasan Festival

 
Provinces of the Philippines
Provinces of Central Visayas
States and territories established in 1890
1890 establishments in the Philippines